Selkirk is a provincial electoral division in the Canadian province of Manitoba.  It was created by redistribution in 1957 from part of St. Andrews, and has formally existed since the provincial election of 1958.  It is named after the city of Selkirk, which in turn was named for Thomas Douglas, 5th Earl of Selkirk, who set up the Red River Colony colonization project in 1811.

Selkirk is bordered to the east by Lac Du Bonnet, to the south by Springfield, to the west by Gimli, and to the north by Lake Winnipeg.

Most of the riding's population is located in the city of Selkirk. Other communities in the riding include Belair and Grand Marais, and there is a significant amount of agricultural land in the riding as well.

The riding's population in 1996 was 19,409.  In 1999, the average family income was $51,605, and the unemployment rate was 8.30%.  Health and social services account for 16% of all industry in the riding.

Thirteen per cent of Selkirk's residents are aboriginal, while 8% are Ukrainian and 6% German.

The riding was safe for the New Democratic Party from 1969 to 2016, although the Liberal Party held the seat from 1988 to 1990.  Former Premier of Manitoba Howard Pawley represented Selkirk from 1969 to 1988.

The current MLA is Progressive Conservative Alan Lagimodiere, who was first elected in 2016 in the wave that saw his party win government. He is the first Tory to win the seat.

List of provincial representatives

Electoral results

1958 general election

1959 general election

1962 general election

1966 general election

1969 general election

1973 general election

1977 general election

1981 general election

1986 general election

1988 general election

1990 general election

1995 general election

1999 general election

2003 general election

2007 general election

2011 general election

2016 general election

2019 general election

Previous boundaries

References

Selkirk, Manitoba
Manitoba provincial electoral districts